Camiel Van de Velde (4 February 1903 – 26 July 1985) was a Belgian long-distance runner. He competed in the men's 5000 metres at the 1924 Summer Olympics.

References

External links
 

1903 births
1985 deaths
Athletes (track and field) at the 1924 Summer Olympics
Belgian male long-distance runners
Olympic athletes of Belgium
Place of birth missing